Thomas White, Jr.  (August 21, 1939 – August 27, 2010) was a member of the New York City Council from Queens.  A Democrat, he represented the 28th Council district, which includes the neighborhoods of Jamaica, South Jamaica, and Richmond Hill.

He co-founded and was the Executive Director of J-CAP, an alcohol and substance abuse residential treatment program in New York State.

White won the Democratic primary vote in November 2009 to seek a new term, following the overturning of term limits at the insistence of New York City's Mayor Michael Bloomberg in a vote by the New York City Council, by a six votes. This small margin of victory has been attributed by some political observers to public anger over the  overturning by the City Council of two referendums supporting eight-year term limits. Five other council incumbents, four of whom had voted to overturn term limits, lost their bids for re-election, the largest such number since the 1980s.

References

1939 births
2010 deaths
New York City Council members
New York (state) Democrats
Politicians from Queens, New York
African-American New York City Council members
20th-century African-American people
21st-century African-American people